Namshir District is a district (bakhsh) in Baneh County, Kurdistan Province, Iran. At the 2006 census, its population was 19,018, in 3,561 families.  The District has one city: Kani Sur. The District has three rural districts (dehestan): Bowalhasan Rural District, Kani Sur Rural District, and Nameh Shir Rural District.

References 

Baneh County
Districts of Kurdistan Province